The Ambassador from New Zealand to Spain is New Zealand's foremost diplomatic representative in the Kingdom of Spain, and in charge of New Zealand's diplomatic mission in Spain.

The embassy is located in Madrid, Spain's capital city.  New Zealand has maintained a resident ambassador in Spain since 1992.  The Ambassador to Spain is concurrently accredited to Morocco.

List of heads of mission

Ambassadors to Spain

Non-resident ambassadors, resident in France
 John G. McArthur (1977–1979)
 John Scott (1979–1984)
 John G. McArthur (1984–1987)

Non-resident ambassadors, resident in Italy
 Tony Small (1987–1990)
 Peter Bennett (1990–1992)

Resident ambassadors
 Paul Tipping (1992–1996)
 Wilbur Dovey (1996–2000)
 Christine Bogle (2000–2005)
 Geoff Ward (2005-2008)
 Rob Moore-Jones (2008-2012)
 Michael Swain (2012-2016)
 Andrew Jenks (2016-2018)
 Nigel Fyfe (2018–present)

See also
 New Zealand–Spain relations

References

 New Zealand Heads of Overseas Missions: Spain.  New Zealand Ministry of Foreign Affairs and Trade.  Retrieved on 2008-03-29.

Spain, Ambassadors from New Zealand to
New Zealand
Ambassadors